Lentorbis carringtoni is a species of air-breathing freshwater snail, aquatic pulmonate gastropod mollusk in the family Planorbidae, the ram's horn snails.

Distribution
Distribution of Lentorbis carringtoni include Malawi, Mozambique and South Africa.

Description 
All species within family Planorbidae have sinistral shells.

References

Planorbidae
Gastropods described in 1961